Amédée Gosselin (September 30, 1863 – December 20, 1941) was a Canadian historian, academic administrator and Roman Catholic priest.

Early life 
On September 30, 1863, Gosselin was born in Saint-Charles-de-Bellechasse, Canada East.

Education 
Gosselin studied the classical course and theology from 1878 until 1890 at the Petit Séminaire de Québec and the Grand Séminaire de Québec.

Career 
Gosselin was ordained as a priest.
Gosselin taught Canadian history and rhetoric. His principal work was  L'Instruction au Canada sous le Régime français, which won him the Verret Prize. He was the seminary's archivist, and became superior of the institution and rector of Université Laval from 1909 until 1915 and from 1927 until 1929.

He was an organizer of the Congrès de la langue française and a member of the Société du parler français. He often published articles in the Bulletin des recherches historiques, a historical journal. On December 20, 1941, he died in Quebec City.

See also 
 Université Laval
 List of rectors of Université Laval

References

External links
 Fonds Amédée Gosselin

1863 births
1941 deaths
20th-century Canadian historians
Canadian male non-fiction writers
Rectors of Université Laval
19th-century Canadian Roman Catholic priests
People from Chaudière-Appalaches
20th-century Canadian Roman Catholic priests